Thomas Edmond John Fitton  (16 August 1911 – 31 August 2000), known as John, was an Anglo-Irish first-class cricketer and Royal Air Force officer.

Life

Fitton was born in Ireland at Killarney in August 1911. He was educated in England at Trent College, before going up to Brasenose College, Oxford. While studying at Oxford, he made a single appearance in first-class cricket for Oxford University against the touring South Americans at Oxford in 1932. Fitton was unbeaten in both Oxford innings', with scores of 4 and 3 respectively. He also took two wickets with his right-arm medium-fast bowling in the South Americans first innings, dismissing Dennet Ayling and Cyril Ayling.

Military career 
After graduating from Oxford, Fitton joined the Royal Air Force as a pilot officer on probation in October 1935. From April 1936–September 1937, he was a pilot with 43 Squadron, before becoming a flight instructor in September 1937. He was promoted to flying officer in April 1938, before being granted the acting rank of flight lieutenant in April 1939 before relinquishing rank in August 1939. Fitton transferred to the Technical Branch in April 1940, at which point he held the full rank of flight lieutenant. He was granted the temporary ranks of squadron leader in June 1941 and wing commander in June 1942. In November 1942, he was made a full squadron leader, antedated to June 1941. 

Following the war, he was promoted to wing commander in July 1947, before being promoted to group captain in July 1953. Fitton became the deputy director of the Technical Services in September 1958, He was promoted to air commodore in July 1961, with Fitton being made an CBE in the 1962 New Year Honours. In June 1963, he was appointed director of mechanical engineering with 1 RAF. He retired from active service in August 1966. Fitton died in Devon in August 2000.

Personal life
Fitton was married to Ruth Trewyn, née Oliver. They had one son.

References

External links

1911 births
2000 deaths
People from Killarney
People educated at Trent College
Alumni of Brasenose College, Oxford
Irish cricketers
English cricketers
Oxford University cricketers
Royal Air Force officers
Royal Air Force personnel of World War II
Royal Air Force air commodores
Commanders of the Order of the British Empire